The 46th NAACP Image Awards, presented by the NAACP, honored outstanding representations and achievements of people of color in motion pictures, television, music and literature during the 2014 calendar year. The 46th ceremony was hosted by Anthony Anderson and broadcast on TV One. All nominees are listed below with the winners listed in bold.

Motion Picture

Outstanding Motion Picture
 Belle
 Beyond the Lights
 Dear White People
 Get On Up
 Selma

Outstanding Actor in a Motion Picture
 Chadwick Boseman – Get On Up
 David Oyelowo – Selma
 Denzel Washington – The Equalizer
 Idris Elba – No Good Deed
 Nate Parker – Beyond the Lights

Outstanding Actress in a Motion Picture
 Gugu Mbatha-Raw – Belle
 Quvenzhané Wallis – Annie
 Taraji P. Henson – No Good Deed
 Tessa Thompson – Dear White People
 Viola Davis – The Disappearance of Eleanor Rigby

Outstanding Supporting Actor in a Motion Picture
 Andre Holland – Selma
 Cedric the Entertainer – Top Five
 Common – Selma
 Danny Glover – Beyond the Lights
 Wendell Pierce – Selma

Outstanding Supporting Actress in a Motion Picture
 Viola Davis – Get On Up
 Carmen Ejogo – Selma
 Jill Scott – Get On Up
 Octavia Spencer – Get On Up
 Oprah Winfrey – Selma

Outstanding Independent Motion Picture
 Belle
 Dear White People
 Half of a Yellow Sun
 Jimi: All Is by My Side
 Life of a King

Television

Outstanding Drama Series
 Being Mary Jane
 Grey's Anatomy
 House of Cards
 How to Get Away with Murder
 Scandal

Outstanding Comedy Series
 black-ish
 House of Lies
 Key & Peele
 Orange Is the New Black
 Real Husbands of Hollywood

Outstanding Talk Series
 Oprah Prime
 Steve Harvey
 The Queen Latifah Show
 The View
 The Wendy Williams Show

Outstanding Variety (Series or Special)
 BET Awards 2014
 Family Feud
 On the Run Tour: Beyoncé and Jay-Z
 Oprah's Master Class
 UNCF An Evening of Stars

Outstanding Actor in a Drama Series
 LL Cool J – NCIS: Los Angeles (CBS) 
 Shemar Moore – Criminal Minds (CBS) 
 Omar Epps – Resurrection (ABC) 
 Omari Hardwick – Being Mary Jane (BET)  
 Taye Diggs – Murder in the First (TNT)

Outstanding Actress in a Drama Series
 Nicole Beharie – Sleepy Hollow (FOX) 
 Kerry Washington – Scandal (ABC)
 Octavia Spencer – Red Band Society (FOX) 
 Gabrielle Union – Being Mary Jane (BET) 
 Viola Davis – How to Get Away with Murder (ABC)

Outstanding Supporting Actor in a Drama Series
 Alfred Enoch – How to Get Away with Murder (ABC) 
 Courtney B. Vance – Masters of Sex (Showtime) 
 Guillermo Diaz – Scandal (ABC) 
 Jeffrey Wright – Boardwalk Empire (HBO) 
 Joe Morton – Scandal (ABC)

Outstanding Supporting Actress in a Drama Series
 Aja Naomi King – How to Get Away with Murder (ABC) 
 Alfre Woodard – State Of Affairs (NBC) 
 Chandra Wilson – Grey's Anatomy (ABC) 
 Jada Pinkett Smith – Gotham (FOX) 
 Khandi Alexander – Scandal (ABC)

Outstanding Host in a Talk, Reality, News/ Information or Variety (Series or Special)
 Steve Harvey – Steve Harvey (Syndicated)
 Queen Latifah – The Queen Latifah Show (Syndicated)
 Chris Rock – BET Awards 2014 (BET)
 Gwen Ifill – America After Ferguson (PBS)
 Melissa Harris-Perry – Melissa Harris-Perry (MSNBC)

Outstanding Television Movie, Mini-Series or Dramatic Special
 American Horror Story: Freak Show (FX) 
 Drumline: A New Beat (VH1) 
 The Gabby Douglas Story (Lifetime) 
 A Day Late and a Dollar Short (Lifetime) 
 The Trip To Bountiful (Lifetime)

Outstanding Actor in a Television Movie, Mini-Series or Dramatic Special
 Blair Underwood – The Trip To Bountiful (Lifetime)
 Charles S. Dutton – Comeback Dad (UP) 
 Larenz Tate – Gun Hill (BET) 
 Mekhi Phifer – A Day Late and a Dollar Short (Lifetime)   
 Ving Rhames – A Day Late and a Dollar Short (Lifetime)

In Memoriam
The song "Jesus is Love" by the Commodores was played during the "In Memoriam" segment.

 Maya Angelou
 Tony Gwynn
 Mario Cuomo
 Joe Sample
 Chester Nez
 Bobby Womack
 Anna Gordy Gaye
 Casey Kasem
 Lowell Steward
 Rubin Carter
 Yuri Kochiyama
 Alice Coachman
 Andraé Crouch
 Meshach Taylor
 Ernie Banks
 Big Bank Hank
 Dollree Mapp
 Joe Wilder
 Ruby Dee
 Marion Barry
 William G. Mays
 Frankie Knuckles
 Edward Brooke
 Jonathan Hicks
 Jimmy Ellis
 Geoffrey Holder
 Charlie Sifford
 Jimmy Ruffin
 Stuart Scott

External links
 NAACP Image Awards official site

NAACP Image Awards
N
N
N
NAACP Image